Hans-Dieter Kronzucker (born 22 April 1936) is a German journalist and television presenter.

Life 
Kronzucker was born in Munich, the son of an opera singer mother and a father who worked in the tourism industry. He grew up in Cologne and Tegernsee, Bavaria. He attended the Wittelsbacher-Gymnasium in Munich, graduating in 1954; during his time there, he founded and was the editor-in-chief of the school newspaper. He then studied philosophy and cultural history in Munich, Barcelona and Vienna, completing his PhD at the University of Vienna.

Kronzucker worked for many years as a journalist and television presenter in Germany, and is perhaps best known for presenting news magazine heute-journal, which he presented from 1978 until 1980, and again between 1986 and 1988. From 2001 to 2007, Kronzucker worked as professor at University of Television and Film Munich. Kronzucker lives in Berlin, Munich and Tegernsee.

In 1980, his two daughters, Sabine and Susanne, along with a nephew, were kidnapped while on holiday in Barberino Val d'Elsa, Tuscany. They were held captive for more than two months, being released after their families paid a ransom of 4.3 million Deutschmarks to the kidnappers. Susanne later went on to become a well-known journalist in her own right, for many years presenting news programme RTL aktuell, as deputy to anchor Peter Kloeppel.

Awards 
 1985: Goldener Gong for Bilder aus Amerika, together with Hanns-Joachim Friedrichs
 1988: Leo-M.-Goodman-Award
 2002: Mitteldeutscher Medienpreis Hans Klein, lifetime achievement award
 2007: Media award by the city of Munich
 2008: Bayerischer Fernsehpreis

References

External links 

Dieter Kronzucker on N24.de

Susanne and Dieter Kronzucker in interview with Park Avenue, 9/2008

Journalists from Munich
German male journalists
German television presenters
German television journalists
German broadcast news analysts
20th-century German journalists
21st-century German journalists
Living people
1936 births
German male writers
Television people from Munich
ARD (broadcaster) people
ZDF people
RTL Group people
Sat.1 people
Norddeutscher Rundfunk people